Lophophora diffusa, commonly known as false peyote,  is a species of plant in the family Cactaceae and one of the only two species in the Lophophora genus. It is endemic to Mexico in the outskirts of Querétaro. This species contains zero to trace amounts of mescaline; pellotine, whose psychoactive effects are comparatively minimal, is the principal alkaloid. The species name diffusa refers to the flat tubercles that are outspread without the plant having prominent ribs.

Description
The plants are yellow-green, usually lacking well-defined ribs and furrows. The podaria are rarely elevated, but are broad and flat. The tufts of hair are usually spread unequally on the prominent podaria. The flowers are commonly whitish to yellowish-white.

Distribution
Its natural habitat is semi-deserts on slopes and river beds, and under the shade of various shrubs and nurse plants. It is considered vulnerable due to a very small distribution range, small population of less than 3,000 individuals, and illegal collecting. It is collected illegally by people seeking peyote, and as an ornamental plant.

References

Flora of Mexico
diffusa
Vulnerable plants
Taxonomy articles created by Polbot
Taxa named by Léon Croizat